Cyril Arthur  Barnes (1926-2000) was an eminent Anglican priest in the second half of the 20th century.

He was born on 10 January  1926, educated at  Penistone Grammar School and Edinburgh Theological College  and ordained  after National Service with the King's Own Scottish Borderers in  1950. He was  Curate at  St John's, Aberdeen and was then Rector of  St John's, Forres until 1955. He was Priest in Charge at St John the Evangelist, Wentbridge and then Vicar of St Bartholomew's, Ripponden with St John's, Rishworth until 1967. After this he was Rector of Christ Church, Huntly with St Marnan's, Aberchirder and Holy Trinity, Keith. He was Dean of Moray, Ross and Caithness from 1980 until 1983. He died on 21 January 2000.

Notes

1926 births
People educated at Penistone Grammar School
Deans of Moray, Ross and Caithness
2000 deaths
Alumni of Edinburgh Theological College